Sphingobacterium cibie is a Gram-negative, aerobic, rod-shaped and non-motile bacterium from the genus of Sphingobacterium which has been isolated from food-waste compost.

References

External links
Type strain of Sphingobacterium cibi at BacDive -  the Bacterial Diversity Metadatabase

 

Sphingobacteriia
Bacteria described in 2016